Tha Return is the first independent album by Lil Zane. It was released on February 26, 2008. The album failed to match the success of Zane's previous albums and failed to make it to any Billboard chart. "Like This" was released as a single, which also failed to chart. The video for the single was heavily played on TV. To date the album sold over 10,000 copies.

Track listing

References

External links
 Music video for "Like This"

2008 albums
Lil Zane albums